Jan Kaye (born 29 January 1996) is a Swiss professional footballer who plays as a striker for Régional 1 club Grande-Synthe.

Career
In January 2017, Kaye joined Grenoble on loan from Troyes. In April, having made just three appearances, the loan was cut short.

Personal life
Kaye was born in Switzerland to a Belgian father and Martiniquais mother.

References

1996 births
Living people
Association football forwards
Footballers from Geneva
Swiss people of Belgian descent
Swiss people of Martiniquais descent
Swiss men's footballers
Ligue 2 players
Régional 1 players
ES Troyes AC players
Thonon Evian Grand Genève F.C. players
Grenoble Foot 38 players
Andrézieux-Bouthéon FC players
US Saint-Malo players
Olympique Grande-Synthe players